This is a list of Nepal one day International cricket records, that is record of team and individual performances in One Day International cricket.

Nepal played their first ODI match against Netherlands on August 1, 2018 and these records date from that match.

Listing criteria 
In general the top five are listed in each category (except when there is a tie for the last place among the five, in which case, all the tied record holders are noted).

The bolted name of the player represents the player who played at least one ODI match in the ongoing season.

Team records

Team wins, losses and ties

Matches played (total)

Head-to-head records

First bilateral ODI series wins

Team scoring records

Highest innings totals

Highest match aggregate

Largest successful run chases

Lowest innings totals

Lowest match aggregate

Highest win margins (by wickets)

Lowest win margins (by wickets)

Highest win margins (by balls remaining)

Lowest win margins (by balls remaining)

Highest win margins (by runs)

Lowest win margins (by runs)

Individual records

Individual records (batting)

Most career runs

Most career centuries

Most career half-centuries

Highest career average

Highest career strike rate

Highest individual score

Most career sixes

Most career fours

Most Ducks

Most Runs in a Series

Individual records (bowling)

Most career wickets

Best career averages

Best career economy rate

Best career strike rate

Best Bowling figures

Hat-tricks 
None

Most Four (and over) wickets in an innings

Most Five wickets in an innings

Most runs conceded in an innings

Most wickets in a series

Individual records (fielding) 

This list does not include catches taken by wicketkeeper.

Most catches in career

Most catches in an innings

Most catches in a series

Individual records (wicketkeeping)

Most dismissals in career

Most dismissals in an innings

Most dismissals in a series

Individual records (other)

Most matches played in career

Most matches played as captain

Most matches won as captain

Partnership Records

Highest partnerships (by runs) 

 Note: An asterisk (*) signifies an unbroken partnership (i.e. neither of the batsmen were dismissed before either the end of the allotted overs or they reached the required score).

Highest partnerships (by wicket) 

 Note: An asterisk (*) signifies an unbroken partnership (i.e. neither of the batsmen were dismissed before either the end of the allotted overs or they reached the required score).

Notes and references

See also 

 Nepal national cricket team
 List of Nepal Twenty20 International cricketers
 List of Twenty20 International records
 Nepal women's national cricket team
List of Nepal Twenty20 International cricket records

Nepal in international cricket
Nepalese cricket lists